Ali Ahmed may refer to:
 Knud Holmboe (1902–1931), convert to Islam and murder victim, changed his name to Ali Ahmed
 Ali Ahmed (Guantanamo captive 303), sent home from Guantanamo on 2003-7-16; see Pakistani captives in Guantanamo
 Ali Ahmed (actor) (born 1971), Maldivian actor
 Ali Ahmed (archer) (born 1973), Qatari archer
 Ali Ahmed (cricketer) (born 1994), Dutch cricketer
 Ali Ahmed (soccer) (born 2000), Canadian soccer player

See also